Volvarina avenella is a species of sea snail, a marine gastropod mollusk in the family Marginellidae, the margin snails.

Description
This species occurs in the Gulf of Mexico.

Distribution
V. avenella can be found in Caribbean waters, ranging from the Florida Keys to Cuba.

References

 Cossignani T. (2006). Marginellidae & Cystiscidae of the World. L'Informatore Piceno. 408pp.
 G., F. Moretzsohn, and E. F. García. 2009. Gastropoda (Mollusca) of the Gulf of Mexico, pp. 579–699 in Felder, D.L. and D.K. Camp (eds.), Gulf of Mexico–Origins, Waters, and Biota. Biodiversity. Texas A&M Press, College Station, Texas.

Marginellidae
Gastropods described in 1881